Palmares Paulista is a municipality in the state of São Paulo, Brazil. The city has a population of 13,486 inhabitants and an area of 82.1 km².

Palmares Paulista belongs to the Mesoregion of São José do Rio Preto.

References

Municipalities in São Paulo (state)